National Highway 752G, commonly referred to as NH 752G is a national highway in  India. It is a spur road of National Highway 52. NH-752G traverses the states of Madhya Pradesh and Maharashtra in India.

Route 
Sendwa, Khetia, Shahada, Prakasha, Nandurbar, Visarwadi, Sakri, Pimpalner, Satana, Deola, Chandvad, Manmad, Yeola, Kopargaon, Shirdi.

Junctions  

  Terminal near Sendwa.
  Terminal near Shirdi.

See also 

 List of National Highways in India
 List of National Highways in India by state

References

External links 

 NH 752G on OpenStreetMap

National highways in India
National Highways in Maharashtra
National Highways in Madhya Pradesh